The Ennis Hospital is a public hospital located in Ennis, County Clare, Ireland. It is managed by UL Hospitals Group.

History
The hospital was officially opened as the Ennis County Hospital on 4 October 1940. It became the Mid-Western Regional Hospital, Ennis in 2004. The 24-hour accident & emergency service ceased in 2009. It was renamed Ennis Hospital in 2013 when the hospitals in the greater Mid-West Region became part of a single operating and governance structure known as the UL Hospitals Group.

Services
The hospital provides 102 beds, of which 96 are in-patient acute beds, while 6 are reserved for acute day cases.

See also
 University Hospital Limerick
 Nenagh Hospital

References

External links

Buildings and structures in Ennis
Health Service Executive hospitals
Hospital buildings completed in 1940
Hospitals in County Clare
Hospitals established in 1940
1940 establishments in Ireland
20th-century architecture in the Republic of Ireland